According to Pakistan Environmental Protection Agency, as of October 1997, there are 10 National Monuments within the country. An additional monument, Pakistan Monument was built in the capital, Islamabad, during the 2000s. There are four monuments in Sindh (all in Karachi), four in Punjab (out of which three are in Lahore), and only one in Balochistan.

References

Monuments and memorials in Pakistan
Monuments